The 1999 Pop Secret Microwave Popcorn 400 was the 31st stock car race of the 2001 NASCAR Winston Cup Series and the 25th iteration of the event. The race was held on Sunday, October 24, 1999, before an audience of 50,000 in Rockingham, North Carolina, at North Carolina Speedway, a  permanent high-banked racetrack. The race took the scheduled 393 laps to complete. In the final laps of the race, Roush Racing driver Jeff Burton would manage to pull away from the field with 68 to go to win his 11th career NASCAR Winston Cup Series victory and his sixth and final victory of the season. To fill out the podium, Bill Davis Racing driver Ward Burton and Joe Gibbs Racing driver Bobby Labonte would finish second and third, respectively.

Background 

North Carolina Speedway was opened as a flat, one-mile oval on October 31, 1965. In 1969, the track was extensively reconfigured to a high-banked, D-shaped oval just over one mile in length. In 1997, North Carolina Motor Speedway merged with Penske Motorsports, and was renamed North Carolina Speedway. Shortly thereafter, the infield was reconfigured, and competition on the infield road course, mostly by the SCCA, was discontinued. Currently, the track is home to the Fast Track High Performance Driving School.

Entry list 

 (R) denotes rookie driver.

Practice

First practice 
The first practice session was held on Friday, October 22, at 10:00 AM EST. The session would last for one hour and 15 minutes.

Second practice 
The second practice session was held on Friday, October 22, at 12:00 PM EST. The session would last for 30 minutes.

Final practice 
The final practice session, sometimes referred to as Happy Hour, was held on Saturday, October 23, after the preliminary 1999 Kmart 200. The session would last for one hour.

Qualifying 
Qualifying was split into two rounds. The first round was held on Friday, October 22, at 2:00 PM EST. Each driver would have one lap to set a time. During the first round, the top 25 drivers in the round would be guaranteed a starting spot in the race. If a driver was not able to guarantee a spot in the first round, they had the option to scrub their time from the first round and try and run a faster lap time in a second round qualifying run, held on Saturday, October 23, at 9:30 AM EST. As with the first round, each driver would have one lap to set a time. Positions 26-36 would be decided on time, while positions 37-43 would be based on provisionals. Six spots are awarded by the use of provisionals based on owner's points. The seventh is awarded to a past champion who has not otherwise qualified for the race. If no past champion needs the provisional, the next team in the owner points will be awarded a provisional.

Four drivers would fail to qualify: Dave Marcis, Rich Bickle, Hut Stricklin, and Ed Berrier.

Full qualifying results

Race results

References 

1999 NASCAR Winston Cup Series
NASCAR races at Rockingham Speedway
October 1999 sports events in the United States
1999 in sports in North Carolina